Calliostoma anseeuwi is a species of medium-sized deepwater sea snail, a marine gastropod mollusc in the family Calliostomatidae.

Description
The shell grows to a height of 23 mm.

Distribution
This species is endemic to the Philippines. It lives at depths of between 100 and 200 m. The shell height is up to 23 mm.

References

External links
 

anseeuwi
Gastropods described in 2006